Miločani is a village in the municipality of Nikšić, Montenegro.

Demographics
According to the 2011 census, its population was 1,006.

References

Populated places in Nikšić Municipality